Donald Gene "Babe" Chandler (September 5, 1934 – August 11, 2011) was a professional American football player.  He was a punter and placekicker in the National Football League (NFL) for 12 seasons in the 1950s and 1960s.  Chandler played college football for the University of Florida, and thereafter, he played professionally for the New York Giants and the Green Bay Packers of the NFL.

Early years 

Chandler was born in Council Bluffs, Iowa.  He attended Will Rogers High School in Tulsa, Oklahoma, and he played for the Will Rogers Ropers high school football team.

College career 

After graduating from high school, Chandler first attended Bacone College in Muskogee, Oklahoma, and then transferred to the University of Florida in Gainesville, Florida, where he played halfback, punter and placekicker for coach Bob Woodruff's Florida Gators football team in 1954 and 1955.  As a senior in 1955, Chandler led all major college punters with an average kick of 44.3 yards, narrowly beating out Earl Morrall of the Michigan State Spartans.  Memorably, Chandler also kicked a 76-yard punt against the Georgia Tech Yellow Jackets in 1955, which remains tied for the second longest punt in Gators history.  Woodruff ranked him and Bobby Joe Green as the Gators' best kickers of the 1950s.

Chandler graduated from Florida with a bachelor's degree in 1956, and was later inducted into the University of Florida Athletic Hall of Fame as a "Gator Great."

Professional career 

After college, he was selected in the fifth round (57th pick overall) of the 1956 NFL Draft, and played with the New York Giants and Green Bay Packers.  He played in the first two overtime games ever in the NFL, in 1958 with the Giants against the Baltimore Colts and again in 1965 when he kicked the winning field goal for the Packers against the same Colts in a Western Conference playoff game at Green Bay.  Chandler's fourth-quarter field goal that tied the game at 10–10 stirred controversy, as many Baltimore players and fans thought he missed the kick to the right.  Chandler was named the punter on the NFL 1960s All-Decade Team.  He went to the Pro Bowl after the 1967 season.

He led the NFL in average yards per punt with 44.6 yards in 1957 and led the league with a field goal percentage of 67.9 percent on 19 of 28 attempts in 1962.  Chandler still holds the record for most field goals scored in a Super Bowl with four in the 1968 Super Bowl against the Oakland Raiders, clinching the championship for the Packers.

Chandler helped Vince Lombardi's Green Bay Packers teams win Super Bowls I and II.  Memorably, he kicked a 90-yard punt against the San Francisco 49ers in 1965.  He was named to the All Pro team in 1967.

In his 12-season NFL career, Chandler played in 154 regular season games, kicked 660 punts for a total of 28,678 yards, 248 extra points on 258 attempts, and 94 field goals on 161 attempts.  He also rushed for 146 yards on 13 carries, and completed a perfect three passes on three attempts for a total of 67 yards.

Life after football 

Chandler was inducted into the Packer Hall of Fame in 1975, along with tight end Ron Kramer, defensive end Willie Davis, guards Jerry Kramer and Fuzzy Thurston and Vince Lombardi.  He was selected as the premier punter for the decade in the 1960s.  In 2002, he was named to the Oklahoma Team of the Century by The Oklahoman. In 2003, he was added to the list of Oklahoma's Greatest Athletes by the Tulsa World.  Chandler is also a member of the Oklahoma Sports Hall of Fame and the New York Giants Wall of Fame.

Chandler died at his home in Tulsa, Oklahoma on August 11, 2011; he was 76 years old.

See also
 List of Florida Gators in the NFL Draft
 List of Green Bay Packers players
 List of New York Giants players
 List of University of Florida alumni
 List of University of Florida Athletic Hall of Fame members

References

Bibliography 

 Carlson, Norm, University of Florida Football Vault: The History of the Florida Gators, Whitman Publishing, LLC, Atlanta, Georgia (2007).  .
 Golenbock, Peter, Go Gators!  An Oral History of Florida's Pursuit of Gridiron Glory, Legends Publishing, LLC, St. Petersburg, Florida (2002).  .
 Hairston, Jack, Tales from the Gator Swamp: A Collection of the Greatest Gator Stories Ever Told, Sports Publishing, LLC, Champaign, Illinois (2002).  .
 McCarthy, Kevin M.,  Fightin' Gators: A History of University of Florida Football, Arcadia Publishing, Mount Pleasant, South Carolina (2000).  .
 McEwen, Tom, The Gators: A Story of Florida Football, The Strode Publishers, Huntsville, Alabama (1974).  .
 Nash, Noel, ed., The Gainesville Sun Presents The Greatest Moments in Florida Gators Football, Sports Publishing, Inc., Champaign, Illinois (1998).  .

1934 births
2011 deaths
Sportspeople from Council Bluffs, Iowa
Sportspeople from Tulsa, Oklahoma
Players of American football from Iowa
Players of American football from Oklahoma
American football halfbacks
American football placekickers
American football punters
Bacone Warriors football players
Florida Gators football players
New York Giants players
Green Bay Packers players
Western Conference Pro Bowl players